The 2022 AFL season was the 126th season of the Australian Football League (AFL), the highest level senior men's Australian rules football competition in Australia, which was known as the Victorian Football League until 1989. The season featured eighteen clubs and ran from 16 March until 24 September, comprising a 22 game home-and-away season followed by a finals series featuring the top eight clubs.

The premiership was won by the Geelong Football Club for the tenth time, after defeating  by 81 points in the 2022 AFL Grand Final.

Background
The 2022 season was played during the third year of the COVID-19 pandemic. At the start of the season, the roll-out of Australia's vaccination program was almost complete with 95% of adults vaccinated to a two-dose standard and about 50% having received a booster; and across all states except for Western Australia, practically all social and interstate travel restrictions which had been in place through the latter half of 2021 had been lifted; Western Australia maintained some restrictions into the start of the season. Cases of the virus, particularly the omicron variant which became dominant in December 2021, were widespread in the community for the first time in the pandemic; and confirmed cases and their close contacts were still required to test and isolate, although for shorter periods than earlier in the pandemic.

The main impacts of the pandemic to the AFL season were:
 The league implemented a Vaccination Policy requiring all players and football department staff to be vaccinated against COVID-19; equivalent requirements were implemented by some state governments. Two players – Liam Jones and Cam Ellis-Yolmen – resigned as a result of the mandate. The AFL's mandate was lifted in July, on a similar timeline to those of the state governments.
 A player top-up list and policy was put in place to cover the event of a substantial portion of a team being forced into isolation. Each club could nominate twenty top-up players from their affiliated state league and reserves systems; those players would become eligible to play if fewer than 28 main list players were available due for COVID-19 reasons, but would not otherwise be contracted to the club.

 and the  opened the season in a rematch of the previous season's grand final. The remainder of the fixture was released on 9 December, with only the first nine rounds released with dates and times for each match. The remainder of the fixture from round 10 was left as a floating fixture so as to prioritize the best matches for each round in prime-time slots, and dates were released progressively through the year. For the first time since 2001, some Friday nights had two scheduled games, with each double-header to take games away from a less-favourable or an otherwise occupied timeslot later in the weekend; the broadcast times of the two matches overlapped partially.

Club leadership

Pre-season

The pre-season series of games returned as the 2022 AAMI Community Series, with teams playing one game each. The games were stand-alone, with no overall winner of the series. All games were televised live on Fox Footy.

Home-and-away season

Round 1

Round 2

Round 3

Round 4

Round 5

Round 6

Round 7

Round 8

Round 9

Round 10

Round 11

Round 12

Round 13

Round 14

Round 15

Round 16

Round 17

Round 18

Round 19

Round 20

Round 21

Round 22

Round 23

Ladder

Progression by round
Numbers highlighted in green indicates the team finished the round inside the top 8.
Numbers highlighted in blue indicates the team finished in first place on the ladder in that round.
Numbers highlighted in red indicates the team finished in last place on the ladder in that round.
Underlined numbers indicates the team did not play during that round, either due to a bye or a postponed game.
Subscript numbers indicate ladder position at round's end.

Finals series

Finals week 1

Finals week 2

Finals week 3

Grand final

Win/loss table

Season notes
 recorded its longest winless start to an AFL season, its record standing at 0–5 after five rounds; its previous worst start had been 0–4.
 became the first team since 1977 to place in finals standings in every week except for the last round and miss the finals completely.
Through the home-and-away season,  won a record eleven games by margins less than two goals; no club had previously won more than eight games by such narrow margins in a year.

Player milestones

Coach changes

Awards

Coleman Medal
Numbers highlighted in blue indicates the player led the Coleman Medal at the end of that round.
Numbers underlined indicates the player did not play in that round.

Best and fairest

See also
 2022 AFL Women's season
 AFL Women's season seven
 2022 Australian football code crowds

References

Sources
 Official website
 Season results

 
Australian Football League seasons
A